Xiao Zhan (born 5 October 1991), also known as Sean Xiao,  is a Chinese actor and singer. Xiao Zhan began his career in the entertainment industry when he participated in the idol survival show X-Fire and debuted as a member of the Chinese boy group X Nine. He started his acting career in 2016 and had since won widespread attention for his dramas, including The Untamed (2019), Joy of Life (2019), The Wolf (2020), Douluo Continent (2021) and The Oath of Love (2022). He has won numerous awards and nominations for his roles.

As a singer, Xiao Zhan released a digital single "Spotlight" (光点) at the end of April 2020 and sold over 25.48 million copies within 24 hours of release. It set the Guinness World Record for the fastest-selling digital track in China. On 22 April 2021, he made his stage debut starring in Yang Hua's version of the critically acclaimed eight-hour drama "如夢之夢" (A Dream Like a Dream) in Wuhan.

Early life and education
Xiao Zhan was born on 5 October 1991, in Chongqing. From childhood, he began to learn to paint and play the violin. He studied at Modern International Art Design Academy at Chongqing Technology and Business University. During his university days, he was a member of the class literary committee and the school choir.

In 2012, he set up a photography studio with his friends and served as their main photographer. After his graduation in 2014 and prior to his debut, he worked as a photographer and graphic designer.

Music career
In 2015, after a teacher's recommendation, Xiao participated in the reality TV show X-Fire where he trained to be an idol, as one of 16 contestants. He also participated in recording the program Teen Channel by Tencent. His first stage performance alongside his teammates were at the 2016 Zhejiang TV New Year Concert, where he performed "冻结" (Freeze) and "燃烧吧少年" (Be A Man). He debuted with 8 other members in a group called X Nine in 2016, taking on the position of main vocalist. They released their first mini album X玖 (X Jiu) in September 2016.

In 2018, Xiao sang the soundtrack for the drama Oh! My Emperor in which he also acted in, titled "踩影子" (Stepping on Shadows).

From 2019 to 2021, Xiao went on to sing for the dramas he starred in. He sang a solo track for the series, named as "曲尽陈情" (Song Ends with Chen Qing). For Joy of Life, Xiao sang the ending theme song "余年" (Remaining Years). He also contributed to the OST of his 2021 drama Douluo Continent with his single "策马正少年" (Righteous Youth on Horseback).

From October 2019 up to January 2020, Xiao had been a regular at Dragon TV's singing program Our Song in which veteran singers are paired up with younger singers in the new generation.

On 25 April 2020, Xiao Zhan released his digital single "Spotlight" (光点) which went on to become the highest selling digital single of all time with over 54 million copies sold. For this song, he entered the Guinness World Records for the fastest-selling digital track in China. On 9 March 2021, the single was named the 7th Best Selling Digital Single of 2020 globally by the International Federation of the Phonographic Industry (IFPI), having amassed 1.48 billion subscription stream equivalents worldwide. The song was also listed as one of 10 biggest-selling digital single worldwide by Guinness World Records.

In the later half of 2020, Xiao made an appearance during the finale of Actors, please Stand By Season 2, performing "用尽我的一切奔向你" (Running to You with All I Have) by Bibi Zhou. He also performed two songs during Tencent Video All Star Awards 2020, "余生请多指教" (The Oath of Love) alongside Yang Zi and "最幸运的幸运" (The Luckiest Fortune (lit.)), both are the theme songs of the Chinese TV series The Oath of Love 《余生请多指教》 starring Xiao Zhan, which aired 2 years after this performance.

On 18 November 2022, Xiao Zhan's single  "Spotlight" (光点) was officially released globally on the iTunes platform after two and half years. It was re-named as "Made to Love", the single shot to No. 27 on the Worldwide iTunes Song Chart within hours of its release, it climbed up to No.2 on the Worldwide iTunes Song Chart and No.4 on the European iTunes Song Chart later on the same day. It quickly topped the sales charts in dozens of countries and regions including Canada, Peru, Indonesia, Mexico, Ireland, Japan, Australia, the United States, and Brazil etc. On November 21, Spotlight is named as the best-selling singles of all time by British Far Out Magazine.

Acting career

2016–2018: Early beginnings 

In 2016, Xiao co-starred with Wang Yuwen in Super Star Academy as the main leads, played as Fang Tian Ze, the series gained 1.68 Billion Views on Tencent platform. Xiao also appeared as cameos for some series and films during the period between 2016 and 2018 such as Shuttle Love Millennium 2, Monster Hunt 2 and The Rookies.

In 2018, he starred in the historical romance web drama Oh! My Emperor Season 1 and 2 as second male lead, played Beitang Moran. The series was well-received for its comedic and romantic storyline and had over 3.58 Billion Views in total, Xiao earned recognition with his role as a domineering, yet gentle prince. That same year, he starred in the fantasy action drama Battle Through the Heavens as support role, played Liu Xiuya.

2019–2020: Breakthrough 
In 2019, Xiao co-starred with Wang Yibo in the Xianxia drama The Untamed (陈情令), based on the danmei novel Grandmaster of Demonic Cultivation (魔道祖师) by Mo Xiang Tong Xiu (墨香铜臭). His portrayal of the carefree and unrestrained Wei Wuxian, who evolves into the darker and tormented Yiling Laozu, received very positive reviews, aiding the series' rise in popularity; it had gained over 10 billion views by December 2021. The series also gained a huge following overseas after it became available on Netflix on 25 October 2019.

In August 2019, Xiao was confirmed to star with Yang Zi in the upcoming modern romance drama The Oath of Love as the main leads, playing Gu Wei, a warm and gentle doctor. The series is adapted from the novel Entrust the Rest of My Life to You (余生，请多指教) by Bo Lin Shi Jiang (柏林石匠).

The same year, he played the protagonist Zhang Xiaofan in the film Jade Dynasty, adapted from the xianxia novel Zhu Xian by  Xiao Ding (萧鼎). The film topped the China box office on its opening day, and earned more than 400 million Yuan within 18 days of release. In Thailand, the film set a new record as the highest-grossing Chinese language movie in 10 years.
In September, it was announced that Xiao had established his own studio, "XZ STUDIO", in collaborations with Wajijiwa Entertainment. On 26 November, the historical drama Joy of Life streamed on Tencent and iQIYI, where he played the supporting role Yan Bingyun. The series is based on a novel with the same name by Mao Ni (猫腻).

Xiao starred in The Wolf as Ji Chong, alongside Darren Wang and Li Qin, and the series was released on Tencent Video, iQiyi, and Youku on 19 November 2020. The series topped the popularity indexes in Mainland China since its release and surpassed 500 million views on a single platform within 11 days. As of December 2020, the total number of viewership on the three platforms has exceeded 1 billion, with an average daily view of nearly 100 million.

In late 2020, he was filming a new drama, Ace Troops, which wrapped production on 14 December 2020. He played Gu Yi Ye,  a young ambitious soldier joining army force at 18 years old and the incidents happened to him throughout his 40 years of military career.

2021–present: Rising popularity

In February 2021, the drama Douluo Continent, adapted from the acclaimed book series of the same name by Tang Jia San Shao, premiered in multiple platforms. Xiao played as the protagonist Tang San, a rare wielder of dual martial souls. Douluo Continent is one of the most successful dramas in China gaining a total of 5.70 billion views, with the highest single-day broadcast volume of 211 million views and averages 138 million views per episode. The show was also broadcast abroad in Japan, Thailand, US in different platforms such as WeTV, Amazon Prime, and cable channels. Douluo Continent was also mentioned by China Literature as one of the most successful dramas adopted from IP of the year. Douluo Continent was successful despite its data suppression.

On 29 March 2021, Xiao was announced as the main lead Shi Ying in historical drama The Longest Promise inspired by the fantasy novel "Mirror: Zhu Yan" (朱颜) by author Cang Yue (沧月). The series wrapped on 4 August 2021, and the first trailer was released on 7 June 2021.

On 26 December 2021, the military drama Ace Troops broadcast exclusively on Jiangsu TV and iQIYI platforms. The drama received well response 
and boosted the TV channel CVB viewership up to 89% during its airing period. The series was rerun on AnHui TV, HuBei TV and ShenZhen TV and gained good response in viewership index. 

On March 15, 2022, his highly anticipated drama The Oath of Love began broadcasting on Hunan Television Primetime, as well as the Tencent Web Platform, and simultaneously on WeTV for international audience.  
The drama received a lot of positive reviews, hit 4 billion views on 20 April 2022, in just 37 days of airing. The Weibo character Index for Xiao Zhan's portrayal of Gu Wei breaking a new height at 120. The WeChat Index for Gu Wei hits 164 millions.
On 28 March 2022, Malaysia TV channel Astro HD began broadcasting The Oath Of Love on Primetime. 
On 2 May, The Oath of love is scheduled to have its South Korean premiere at South Korea Ching TV. On 26 May 2022, the series rerun on ShenZhen TV. On September 28, Xiao Zhan and Bai Baihe announced as leads for the series "Sunshine With Me".

Stage shows
In 2020, Xiao Zhan appeared in CCTV New Year's Gala for the first time, acting out a skit Like You Like Me alongside Xie Na.·

On 22 April 2021, Xiao Zhan made his inaugural theatrical appearance in a play, A Dream Like Dream, which paid tribute to the volunteers, community workers and medical staff in Wuhan.  He played Patient No. 5. He has since continued to act the role for many more cities such as Qingdao, Chengdu, Hangzhou, Shenzhen and Beijing. A Dream Like A Dream is listed in China Performance Industry Association's Performance Market Annual Report for 2021, ranked as No. 1 in Theater Category for The Highest average ticket sales in a single screening and annual ticket sales 
and screenings.

To bless Xiao Zhan on his first theatre play, fans from all over the world flooded the Wuhan QinTai Theatre with flower stands which was called as "Flower Ocean". On the same day evening, Xiao Zhan Studio asked for the flowers to be distributed to the people in Wuhan.

Endorsements and ambassadorships

Endorsements
In 2018, Xiao is named as brand spokesperson for Hera and was announced as brand ambassador for AHC. Following the success of The Untamed, he has become one of the most in demand endorsers , partnered with 19 brands between then till 2020. His endorsements range from beverage and washing products, to jewelry and fashion magazines such as Budweiser, Braun, Olay, Tidal, Oppo, Roseonly, Estée Lauder; with most of them breaking their previous sales record. 

In 2021, Xiao Zhan has partnered with 28 brands in total and by 2022 he has collaborated with 14 more brands. He is named as the face of Tod's, Zenith, Gucci, Audi, Ralph Lauren, Yves Saint Laurent, regaining momentum among luxury household brands. He was also announced as brand ambassador and spokesperson for numerous brands such as Li-Ning, Molsion, Dettol, Zwilling, Tencent Video, WeTV, NARS, Loreal professional, PEPSI, Bubly, Tasogare Coffee, Extra Gum, Dove Chocolate, YiDa Haw-haw snack, Mendale, Usmile, Roborock, Ocak, KaiXiaoZao, Breo, Joyoung, JD E-Commerce.

In 2020, Xiao Zhan was named the promotional ambassador for the Beijing Television Spring Gala. On 11 June 2020, the "Public Welfare Aids Agribusiness" hosted by the People's Government of Yu County and People's Online was held in Yu County, Zhangjiakou. Xiao Zhan was invited to become a poverty alleviation Product Experience Officer, participated in the field tour of Yu County, visited local poverty alleviation industries, and helped the promotion of Yu County's characteristic agricultural products and cultural products.

In, 2021 Xiao Zhan became Shanghai Public Security Bureau's Anti-Fraud Alliance Member and promoted their campaign to spread awareness against online long cons and fraudulent fund transfers. He also became the Men's Ice Hockey Promotion Ambassador and National Stadium Winter Dream Promotion Ambassador for the 2022 Beijing Winter Olympics, appearing in the ice hockey episode of Beijing Satellite TV's "The Covenant of Winter Dreams" to help promote awareness of the sports as well as the venue.

On 10 September, during the first day of the one-year countdown to the Hangzhou 2022 Asian Games, Xiao Zhan was appointed as the Hangzhou Asian Games Public Welfare Dream Ambassador. In addition, Xiao Zhan also sang the Hangzhou Asian Games song "We Are All Heading For A Better Future".

Commercial influences 
After he was appointed as the brand endorser for Estée Lauder's fragrance and beauty line, the brand's sales record reportedly surpassed last year single day's record, as well as topping the most popular Chinese brands list for 11:11 and Black Friday 2019. 

In 2022, As once of the top traffic celebrity in the China entertainment industry, after Xiao was announced as brand spokesperson for Audi, the total monthly sales exceeded 200 million Yuan within a month. Later he was announced as NARS spokesperson, the sales volume of flagship store on the first day was nearly 80 million, and the transaction growth rate increased by 20741.14%! It exceeded the quarterly sales of other brands in a day. On April 02, Xiao was announced as PEPSI brand spokesperson, within an hour, the sales volume of a single platform has exceeded 50,000. By the end of April, sales exceeded 100 million Yuan, setting a historical record of surpassing competing products for the first time since the establishment of the factory in a single month. On May 06, Xiao was announced as brand spokesperson for L'Oréal PRO, sales nearly exceeded 40 million Yuan within 24 hours. On July 16, Xiao was announced as the spokesperson for famous skin care brand Yves Saint Laurent, the flagship store sold more than 72 million Yuan on a single platform and attracted more than 1.6 million visitors to the site. On August 22, he attended the Lining’s live stream event and attracted 30 million streamers throughout the broadcast.

Recognitions 
Xiao Zhan was placed second on I-Magazine Fashion Face Award in 2018.

Forbes China listed him under their 30 Under 30 Asia 2019 list, which consisted of 30 influential people under 30 years old who have had a substantial effect in their fields. The actor-singer has been topping various charts for consecutive weeks and months since his breakthrough. He topped the R3 index celebrity ranking from August to November 2019; and the Star Fashion Value by Sina Fashion in August and October 2019. He also topped Ai Man's Data Star's Business Value list for the month of September to November.

Xiao Zhan is named as Most Handsome Faces in Asia in 2019, 2020, Most Influential Faces of 2020, Most Handsome Face in Asia Pacific 2020 by TCC Asia. He was also placed 6th, 7th and 11th for Most Handsome Faces in the World for three consecutive years in 2019, 2020, 2021 by TCC Candler.

He was listed as the Most Handsome Men in the World 2020 by Top Beauty World, as well as the Sexiest Men in the World 2020 and placed 8th and 1st in the Asian Heartthrobs 2020, 2021 by Starmometer. He is named as the number 1 Men in Fashion World 2021 by The World List, placed first in "2021 Fashion Icon of the Year" by World's Choice Awards and was selected as the “Most Handsome Man of 2022” by Nubiai Magazine with 2.2 million votes from much more than 140 nations across the world included votes from the USA, Peru, Thailand, Myanmar, and other nations.

Philanthropy 
As early as 2016, shortly after Xiao Zhan made his debut. Xiao Zhan donated 17,000 Yuan to the Angel Animal Protection - Animal Care Center to purchase 100 cat nests to keep stray cats warm during the winter.

During COVID-19, Xiao Zhan Studio donated various medical supplies, equipment and ventilators to hospitals in need. In 2021, he also donated 1 million Yuan ($210,000) to Zhengzhou Red Cross to help with flood relief in Henan province.

In 2022, Xiao Zhan donated 500,000 Yuan to the Amity Foundation to support the epidemic prevention and control work in Shanghai. On April 22, the procurement of 1,000 material packages was completed, each including rice, edible oil, and milk; another batch of 1,125 material packages had also been purchased, including rice, eggs, milk, edible salt, soy sauce, etc. Subsequent packaged will be delivered and received by the towns and neighborhood committees within the Pudong New Area and distributed to groups in need. On September 08, Xiao Zhan Studio donated 1 million Yuan to Red Cross Society to help with earthquake relief efforts in Luding County, Ganzi Prefecture in Sichuang province.

Controversy 

In February 2020, a slash fan fiction novel hosted on Archive of Our Own called "Falling" went viral on the Chinese social networking site Sina Weibo. The fan fiction depicts a female prostitute named "Xiao Zhan" in a sexual relationship with a minor named "Wang Yibo" (the name of Xiao Zhan's co-star in The Untamed (2019), a TV series adapted from a danmei web novel; due to censorship the duo could not be portrayed as lovers as they are in the novel). Some fans of Xiao Zhan believed the fan fiction to be insulting to Xiao Zhan, and rallied like-minded fans to report the offending post to Sina Weibo officials for containing "pornographic content". The fan fiction was banned on Weibo, causing a surge of traffic from Mainland China to the original source of the fan fiction on Archive of Our Own. Fans subsequently mass reported the site to Chinese authorities and led to it being blocked in the country by the Great Firewall, drawing the ire of its users in Mainland China and backlash against Xiao Zhan. Consequently, he lost numerous brand endorsements and was forced to issue an apology for the actions of his fans.

On 7 May 2020, he made his first official appearance after the incident in an interview with Economic View, explaining his perspective on the issue. On 9 May 2020, Xiao Zhan was invited by BTV to perform Bamboo Rock (竹石) in support of China's healthcare workers who had bravely fought in the frontlines against the pandemic.

On 19 December 2020, Xiao Zhan made his first live performance on the Tencent Video All Star Night Show, where his fans brought lights to show their support; this became known as the "Red Ocean". This resulted in trending topics on Weibo for domestic fans and Twitter for fans abroad, signifying his popularity despite the controversy.

Filmography

Film

Television series

Theatre

Short film

Television show

Discography

Singles

Other appearances

Awards and nominations

Other recognitions

References

External links
 
 

1991 births
Living people
Chinese idols
Chinese Mandopop singers
Male actors from Chongqing
Singers from Chongqing
Chinese male singers
21st-century Chinese male actors
Chinese male television actors
Chinese male film actors
21st-century Chinese male singers